Arraba ( ʻArrābah), also Arrabah, Arrabeh or Arrabet Jenin, is a Palestinian town in the northern West Bank located 12 kilometers southwest of Jenin. It has an elevation of 350 meters above sea level and lies near Sahl Arraba, a plain that lies between Mount Carmel and Nablus. According to the Palestinian Central Bureau of Statistics (PCBS) census, Arraba had a population 10,000 in 2008.

History
The lands of Arraba include Khirbet al-Hamam and Tel el-Muhafer, either of which believed to be the site of the Canaanite town Arubboth from the Books of Kings (Rubutu in the Egyptian documents) and the city Narbata of the Roman period. Tell Dothan is located just north-east of Arraba.

Pottery remains from the late Roman, Byzantine, early Muslim and the Middle Ages have been found here.

In 1229 Yaqut noted that the village had a holy place named after the Prophet Arabil.

During the Crusader period, ‘Arrabeh appears as one of the settlements  marking the eastern boundary of Caesarea district.

Ottoman era
It had a population of 81 households and 31 bachelors, all Muslim. The inhabitants paid a fixed tax rate of 33.3% on agricultural products, including wheat, barley, summer crops, olive trees, occasional revenues, goats and beehives, and a press for olives or grapes; a total of 29,575 akçe.

In 1648-50 Evliya Çelebi described it: “Accompanied by fifty armed mounted beduins we went for five hours in a southerly direction, then for another hour through the valley of Jinin, passed the village of Qabatye and arrived at ‘Arrabe. It consists of a hundred Moslem houses and [its revenue] is set aside for the pasha, who is governor of Nablus.”

In 1838 Arrabeh was noted as a village in the esh-Sharawiyeh esh-Shurkiyeh (the Eastern) district, north of Nablus.

Arraba is the origin of the Abd al-Hadi family, once a leading landowning family in the districts of Afula, Baysan, Jenin, and Nablus. The clan was traditionally opposed to the Tuqan family of Nablus. In the 1850s the Ottoman rulers withdrew their soldiers from the district (to be used in the Crimean War), and hence open hostility ensued between the different Palestinian factions.
The Abd al-Hadis sacked several villages, some of the results were shown to the British consul Rogers when he visited Arraba in 1856.

In April 1859 a coalition of Ottoman troops and local leaders opposed to the Abd al-Hadi clan, stormed Arraba. Members of the Abd al-Hadi clan either fled or were captured, while the fortifications of Arraba were razed and the place plundered. By subduing Arraba, the Ottomans had suppressed the last bastion of independent local rule in the Nablus region.

French explorer Victor Guérin visited the village in 1870, and described it:  "This town is situated on a plateau. ... It is divided into three quarters, one of which was once surrounded by a wall flanked with small towers. This wall is now in great part destroyed, having been overthrown in a siege sustained some years ago during a revolt against the Caimacam of Nablus". In 1882, the PEF's Survey of Western Palestine described  Arraba as "a very large village on the south slope of a ridge, the northern houses on high ground. There is a small mosque in the centre, and one or two large buildings, including the Sheikh's house. The water supply is entirely from wells within the village, and on the road-side towards the north. There is a ridge of very barren rock between the village on the south and the plain (Merj 'Arrabeh) on the north. Scattered olives grow round the village, but the immediate neighbourhood is very bare. The villagers are turbulent and rich, owning very fine lands in the northern plain."

In 1913-14 the Ottomans built a section of the Jezreel Valley railway (itself a branch of the now-defunct Hejaz railway) that passed through Arraba and ended in Nablus.

British Mandate era
In the 1922 census of Palestine, conducted by the British Mandate authorities, Arraba had a population of 2,196, all Muslim. In the 1931 census it had increased to a  population of 2,500, still all Muslim, in 554 inhabited houses.

In the 1945 statistics the population was 3,810 Muslims with 39,901  dunams of land, according to an official land and population survey. five dunams were used for citrus or bananas, 3,568 dunams were used for plantations and irrigable land, 23,357 dunams for cereals, while 315 dunams were built-up (urban) land.

Jordanian era
In the wake of the 1948 Arab–Israeli War, and after the 1949 Armistice Agreements, Arraba came under Jordanian rule. It was annexed by Jordan in 1950.

In 1961, the population of Arraba was  4,865.

Post-1967
Since the Six-Day War in 1967, Arraba, like the rest of the West Bank, has been under Israeli military occupation.

Notable residents
Husayn Abd al-Hadi, d. 1835, powerful rural chief and governor of Sidon
Sami Taha, 1916 − 1947, labor leader in British Mandatory Palestine
Abu Ali Mustafa, 1938 − 2001, secretary-general of the Popular Front for the Liberation of Palestine
Khader Adnan, b. 1978, Palestinian Islamic Jihad activist known for long hunger strike in Israeli prison

References

Bibliography

External links
 Welcome To 'Arabba, Palestine remembered
Arraba, Welcome to Palestine
Survey of Western Palestine, Map 11:   IAA, Wikimedia commons 
 The Municipality's official website 
Throne villages, with Abdel-Hadi palaces in Aarrabeh, RIWAQ
11 Stop Work Orders in the Villages of Barta’a Al Sharqiya and Arraba - Jenin Governorate, 23, February, 2012, (POICA)
Stop-work Orders for Commercial Structures in 'Arraba  17, May, 2012, POICA
Riwaq database of historical buildings 

Towns in the West Bank
Jenin Governorate
Throne villages
Municipalities of the State of Palestine